The China-Costa Rica Free Trade Agreement is a bilateral free trade agreement signed between China and Costa Rica on August 1, 2011.

References

Free trade agreements of China
Bilateral relations of Costa Rica
Treaties concluded in 2011
2011 in Costa Rica
2011 in China